FC Alamudun is a Kyrgyzstani football club based in Alamudun that plays in the top division in Kyrgyzstan, the Kyrgyzstan League.

History 
19??: Founded as FC Dinamo Alamudun.
200?: Renamed FC Luch Altyn-Taala (Alamudun)
2004: Renamed FC Alamudun

Achievements
Kyrgyzstan League:
sixth place, Zone A: 1998

Kyrgyzstan Cup:

Current squad

References

Football clubs in Kyrgyzstan